Georgios Strantzalis (born 23 April 1969) is a Greek professional football manager and former player.

References

1969 births
Living people
Greek footballers
Footballers from Thessaloniki
Association football midfielders
Iraklis Thessaloniki F.C. players
Paniliakos F.C. players
Aris Thessaloniki F.C. players
Kavala F.C. players
Kallithea F.C. players
Patraikos F.C. players
Panachaiki F.C. players
Rodos F.C. players
Super League Greece players
Greek football managers
Rodos F.C. managers
Panachaiki F.C. managers
Kalamata F.C. managers
Ilioupoli F.C. managers
Koropi F.C. managers
Eordaikos 2007 F.C. managers
Apollon Pontou FC managers
Iraklis Thessaloniki F.C. managers
Acharnaikos F.C. managers
Athlitiki Enosi Larissa F.C. managers